Johnny Get Your Gun is a 1919 American comedy silent film directed by Donald Crisp and written by Edmund Lawrence Burke and Gardner Hunting. The film stars Fred Stone, Mary Anderson, Casson Ferguson, James Cruze, Sylvia Ashton, Nina Byron and Mayme Kelso. The film was released on March 16, 1919, by Paramount Pictures.

Plot

Cast
Fred Stone	as Johnny Wiggins
Mary Anderson as Ruth Gordon
Casson Ferguson as Bert Whitney
James Cruze as The Duke of Bullconia
Sylvia Ashton as Aunt Agatha
Nina Byron as Janet Burnham
Mayme Kelso as Mrs. Tupper 
Raymond Hatton as Garry
Jack Hoxie as Bill Burnham 
Dan Crimmins as Pollitt
Fred Huntley as Jevne
Ernest Joy as Lawyer Cotter
Noah Beery, Sr. as Town Marshal
Clarence Geldart as Director

Preservation status
 A print survives at UCLA Film and Television Archive.

References

External links 
 
 

1919 films
1910s English-language films
Silent American comedy films
1919 comedy films
Paramount Pictures films
Films directed by Donald Crisp
American black-and-white films
American silent feature films
1910s American films